Cedar Creek may refer to the following places in the U.S. state of Michigan:

 Cedar Creek Township, Muskegon County, Michigan
 Cedar Creek Township, Wexford County, Michigan
 Cedar Creek (Michigan), any of several streams throughout the state
 Cedar Creek, Barry County, Michigan, an unincorporated community in Hope Township